The Wide Window is the third novel of the children's book series A Series of Unfortunate Events by Lemony Snicket. In this novel, the Baudelaire orphans live with their aunt Josephine, who is seemingly scared of everything. The book was published on February 25, 2000 by HarperCollins and illustrated by Brett Helquist.

Plot

Mr. Poe puts the Baudelaire orphans, Klaus Baudelaire, Sunny Baudelaire and Violet Baudelaire under the care of Aunt Josephine, who lives in a house atop a hill overlooking Lake Lachrymose, a lake so large that hurricanes have occurred in that area. Aunt Josephine is afraid of almost everything from cooking food because she is scared that her stove would explode, to her welcome mat. Her library is filled with books about the grammar of the English language because she loves grammar.

While helping Aunt Josephine in the grocery store, Violet runs into a sailor named "Captain Sham", who she concludes is Count Olaf in disguise. Aunt Josephine declines to believe this due to Captain Sham's charming personality. That night, the children hear a crash and find out that their new guardian had jumped out of the Wide Window that overlooks Lake Lachrymose, and that before doing so left a note for them informing them that Captain Sham will be their new guardian.

Mr. Poe refuses to believe the children's claim the note was a lie by Count Olaf and takes them to dinner with him at a cheap and grimy restaurant with an over-enthusiastic waiter, the Anxious Clown. Needing a distraction to come up with a strategy, Violet puts peppermints in her own food and that of Klaus and Sunny. Allergic, they break into hives, forcing Count Olaf to allow them to go back to their aunt's house. Klaus shows them the note is in Aunt Josephine's handwriting but coded a hidden message using grammar errors, which all together form the two words 'Curdled Cave'. Once they finish the note, Hurricane Herman hits and the house begins to fall apart into the lake.

With this information, the Baudelaire orphans go to steal a boat from Captain Sham's boat store near Lake Lachrymose to get to Curdled Cave while the hurricane continues on. There, they encounter one of Count Olaf's henchpeople, a large person of undetermined gender. They endure the storm and reach the Curdled Cave, where Aunt Josephine reveals that Count Olaf forced her to write the note, and broke the Wide Window to cause them to believe that she had committed suicide.

While travelling back, Lachrymose leeches attempt to suck their blood due to smelling food in Aunt Josephine's stomach since she ate a banana under the one hour limit. They are able to signal for help, but only Count Olaf arrives on a ship. After leaving Aunt Josephine to be eaten by the leeches, he brings the children back to the house, where Sunny is able to prove that he was Count Olaf to Mr. Poe by biting Count Olaf's fake wooden peg in half to reveal his eye tattoo underneath. He and his henchperson lock the Baudelaire Orphans and Mr. Poe in the gate of Captain Sham's boat rental and escape, leaving Mr. Poe to once again find a home for the orphans.

Foreshadowing
On the side of a building in the picture hangs a sign in the shape of a pair of glasses with a pair of squinting eyes, referencing Dr. Orwell's Office in The Miserable Mill.

Cultural references and literary allusions
The name Damocles Dock presumably alludes to the legendary Greek figure Damocles who had a sword dangling over his head. The picture at the beginning of the book shows the three Baudelaires standing on Damocles Dock. In the archway at the entrance to the dock is a sword dangling over their heads.
In the previous book of the series, the endnote references the Café Kafka, a reference to the Austrian-Hungarian author Franz Kafka. One of Kafka's short stories, "Josephine the Singer, or the Mouse Folk", features Josephine, the only mouse that can sing. In the short story, Josephine's music sounds like whistling if heard from the wrong angle, which may be a reference to Aunt Josephine's late husband's ability to whistle with crackers in his mouth (along with the Baudelaire orphans' mother). Josephine's last name was Anwhistle, making her husband Ike Anwhistle ("I can whistle").
Lachrymose (Lake Lachrymose) means "given to or causing tears".
The TV adaptation includes several references to Moby-Dick, including naming the hurricane Herman after author Herman Melville and the cab driver saying "Call me Ishmael!".

Special editions

The Wide Window; or, Disappearance!
The Wide Window; or, Disappearance! is a paperback re-release of The Wide Window, designed to mimic Victorian penny dreadfuls. It was released on September 4, 2007. The book includes seven new illustrations, and the third part of a serial supplement entitled The Cornucopian Cavalcade, which features a 13-part comic by Michael Kupperman entitled The Spoily Brats, an advice column written by Lemony Snicket, and, as in The Bad Beginning; or, Orphans! and The Reptile Room; or, Murder!, (the final) part of a story by Stephen Leacock entitled Q: A Psychic Pstory of the Psupernatural. This edition was the last of the paperback rereleases of the series - there have not been any more of these .

Translations
 Croatian: ""
 Czech: "", Egmont, 2001, 
 Dutch: "Het Rampzalige Raam", (The Catastrophic Window), Huberte Vriesendorp, 2006, 
 Finnish: "Avara akkuna", (The Wide Window), 
 Greek: "Το Φαρδύ Παράθυρο", Ελληνικά Γράμματα
 Indonesian: "", (The Weird Window), Gramedia, 2003, 10603021
 Japanese "" (Beware the Big Window) 
 Korean: "" (Secrets of the Lacrimal Lake), Munhakdongnae Publishing Co, Ltd., 2002, 
 Norwegian: Iglene i innsjøen (The Leeches in the Lake), Karoline Melli, Cappelen Damm, 2001, 
 Polish : "Ogromne okno" (The Giant Window)
 Brazilian Portuguese: "" (The Lake of Leeches), Cia. das Letras, 2000,
 Russian: "", Azbuka, 2003, 
 Spanish: "", Montena, 2004, 
 Thai: "บ้านประหลาด", Nanmeebooks Teen, 2002,

Adaptations
Elements of The Wide Window were featured in the 2004 film adaptation of the first three books in the series, Lemony Snicket's A Series of Unfortunate Events. The book was adapted into the fifth and sixth episodes of the first season of the television series adaptation produced by Netflix. In the film, Meryl Streep portrays the children's new guardian aunt, Josephine, while Alfre Woodard portrays the character in the TV series.

See also

Violet Baudelaire
Klaus Baudelaire
Sunny Baudelaire
Count Olaf
Arthur Poe

References 

2000 American novels
Books in A Series of Unfortunate Events
HarperCollins books
American novels adapted into films
American novels adapted into television shows
Sequel novels
2000 children's books